Athlitikos Syllogos Evagoras Paphos was a Cypriot football club based in the city of Paphos. Founded in 1961, was playing sometimes in First and sometimes in the Second Division. It has adopted its name from Evagoras Pallikarides, who was a hero from Paphos who was hanged by British Colonists, as he was an EOKA guerrilla, fighting for the freedom of Cyprus. The club's badge was a green shield with the figure of Evagoras Pallikarides's as a face in a circle.

Dissolved
In contrast with the other Districts of Cyprus and other major towns, which had permanent teams in First Division, Paphos did not have such a team as the two clubs of the town, Evagoras and APOP Paphos FC, could not remain in First Division for many years. For this reason the two clubs were merged to form AEP Paphos FC as the people of Paphos wanted a permanent team in First Division.

Honours
Cypriot Second Division
Champions (6): 1968, 1972, 1981, 1989, 1991, 1995

References

 
Association football clubs disestablished in 2000
Defunct football clubs in Cyprus
Association football clubs established in 1961
1961 establishments in Cyprus
2000 disestablishments in Cyprus